Pantheism is the belief that the universe (or nature as the totality of everything) is identical with divinity, or that everything composes an all-encompassing, immanent God. Pantheists do not believe in a distinct personal or anthropomorphic god.

List

 Nammalvar, one of the twelve Alvars.
 Vyasa, writer of Mahabharata.
 Laozi, name traditionally given to the writer of the Tao Te Ching, and considered the founder of philosophical Taoism.
 Heraclitus (c. 535 BCE–c. 475 BCE), pre-Socratic Greek philosopher, a native of the Greek city Ephesus, Ionia, on the coast of Asia Minor. He was of distinguished parentage. Little is known about his early life and education, but he regarded himself as self-taught and a pioneer of wisdom. From the lonely life he led, and still more from the riddling nature of his philosophy and his contempt for humankind in general, he was called "The Obscure" and the "Weeping Philosopher".
 The Stoics (founded early 3rd century BCE) are often considered pantheists for their belief that it is virtuous to maintain a will (called prohairesis) that is in accord with nature and for arguing that physical conceptions are adequate to explain the entire cosmos.
 Adi Shankara (788–820 CE), known for consolidating the doctrine of Advaita Vedānta.
 Johannes Scotus Eriugena (c. 815–c. 877), Irish theologian, Neoplatonist philosopher, and poet.
 Amalric of Bena (died c. 1204–1207), French theologian, father of medieval pantheism, after whom the Amalricians are named.
 Giordano Bruno (1548–1600), Italian Dominican friar, philosopher, mathematician and astronomer. He was burned at the stake for his pantheist views.
 Jakob Böhme (1575–1624), German philosopher, Christian mystic, and Lutheran Protestant theologian.
 Baruch Spinoza (1632–1677), Jewish-Dutch philosopher, has been called the "prophet" and "prince" of pantheism.
 John Toland (1670–1722), an Irish rationalist philosopher and freethinker, and occasional satirist, who wrote numerous books including the Pantheisticon.

 Gotthold Ephraim Lessing (1729–1781), German writer, philosopher, dramatist, publicist and art critic. His alleged confession of Spinozism led to what is known as the pantheism controversy of the 1780s.

Late modern period
 Johann Wolfgang von Goethe (1749–1832), German writer, artist, and politician. His body of work includes epic and lyric poetry written in a variety of metres and styles; prose and verse dramas; memoirs; an autobiography; literary and aesthetic criticism; treatises on botany, anatomy, and colour; and four novels. In addition, numerous literary and scientific fragments, and over 10,000 letters written by him are extant, as are nearly 3,000 drawings.
 Georg Wilhelm Friedrich Hegel (1770–1831), German philosopher, one of the creators of German Idealism.
 Ludwig van Beethoven (1770–1827), German composer and pianist. A crucial figure in the transition between the Classical and Romantic eras in Western art music, he remains one of the most famous and influential of all composers. His best-known compositions include 9 symphonies, 5 concertos for piano, 32 piano sonatas, and 16 string quartets. He also composed other chamber music, choral works (including the celebrated Missa Solemnis), and songs. He has been labeled a deist as well.
 Caspar David Friedrich (1774–1840), German Romantic landscape painter.
 Friedrich Wilhelm Joseph Schelling (1775–1854), German philosopher.
 Hans Christian Ørsted (1777–1851), Danish physicist and chemist who discovered that electric currents create magnetic fields.
 Ralph Waldo Emerson (1803–1882), American essayist, lecturer, and poet, who led the transcendentalist movement of the mid-19th century.
 Alfred, Lord Tennyson (1809–1892), English poet. Tennyson praised Bruno and Spinoza on his deathbed, saying of Bruno, "His view of God is in some ways mine".
 Margaret Fuller (1810–1850), American journalist, editor, critic, translator, and women's rights advocate associated with the American transcendentalist movement.
 Otto von Bismarck (1815–1898), German statesman and diplomat, first Chancellor of the German Empire.
 Henry David Thoreau (1817–1862), American author, poet, philosopher, freemason, abolitionist, naturalist, tax resister, development critic, surveyor, historian, and leading transcendentalist.
 Walt Whitman (1819–1892), American poet, essayist and journalist.
 John Shertzer Hittell (1825–1901), American historian.
 Leo Tolstoy (1828–1910), Russian writer, philosophical essayist and pacifist.
 Robert G. Ingersoll (1833–1899), lawyer, Civil War veteran, political leader, orator, and notable agnostic.
 Ernst Haeckel (1834–1919), German zoologist, natural historian, and philosopher.
 Friedrich Nietzsche (1844–1900), German philosopher. While sometimes interpreted as a proponent of atheistic existentialism by his statements about God, the German philosopher Martin Heidegger says about Nietzsche's conception of divine: “Is Nietzsche here teaching a pan-theism”, asks Heidegger. “If it were pantheism, we would first of all still have to ask what pan — the universe, the whole — and what theos — God — here mean. At all events, here we have a question! So, then, God is not dead? Yes and no! Yes, he is dead. But which God? The God of “morality,” the Christian God is dead — the “Father” in whom we seek sanctuary, the “Personality” with whom we negotiate and bare our hearts, the “Judge” with whom we adjudicate, the “Paymaster” from whom we receive our virtues’ reward, that God with whom we do business. Yet where is the mother who will take pay for loving her child? The God who is viewed in terms of morality, this God alone is meant when Nietzsche says “God is dead.” He died because human beings murdered him. They murdered him when they reckoned his divine grandeur in terms of their petty needs for recompense, when they cut him down to their own size. That God fell from power because he was a “blunder” of human beings who negate themselves and negate life (Nietzsche by Martin Heidegger, VIII, 62). Von Douglas Burham notes, in light of Nietzsche, that "God exists entirely immanently to nature or the cosmos" and that Nietzsche opposed popular forms of atheism as mired by morality: "That is, a “religion of pity” captures the way in which an atheist, for example, surreptitiously retains a direct connection to Christianity through the continuing commitment to morality.". Nietzsche in the posthumously-published "The Will to Power" translated by Walter Kaufmann (philosopher) states

 Felix Klein (1849–1925), German mathematician.
 Nikola Tesla (1856–1943), the Serbian American inventor believed in aether (opposite essentially of gravity) being the source of all existence and energy, sometimes referred to as prana.
 Gustav Mahler (1860–1911), Romantic Austrian composer and one of the leading conductors of his generation.
 Vazha-Pshavela (1861–1915) Georgian poet and writer Luka Razikashvili, noted Georgian patriot and author of the highest calibre in the field of Georgian literature.
 Claude Debussy (1862–1918), French composer.
 Carl Gustav Jung (1875–1961), Swiss psychiatrist and psychotherapist who founded analytical psychology. Jung proposed and developed the concept of the collective unconscious from a pantheistic worldview.

 Janusz Korczak (1878–1942), Polish-Jewish educator, children's author, and pediatrician.
 Albert Einstein (1879–1955), German theoretical physicist, one of the most prolific intellects in human history, identified with Spinoza's God and called his own views on God "pantheistic". Einstein held a wavering view on pantheism and at times did not endorse it completely, making the statement in 1930, "I do not know if I can define myself as a pantheist. The problem involved is too vast for our limited minds." Instead, Einstein also frequently spoke of a more Cosmic Spirituality, a view where religion and science are partnered. Einstein rejected atheism.
 D. H. Lawrence (1885–1930), English novelist, poet, playwright, essayist, literary critic and painter.
 Robinson Jeffers (1887–1962), American poet, known for his work about the central California coast.
 Isidor Isaac Rabi (1898–1988), Galician-born American physicist and Nobel laureate, recognized in 1944 for his discovery of nuclear magnetic resonance, which is used in magnetic resonance imaging. He was also involved in the development of the cavity magnetron, which is used in microwave radar and microwave ovens.
 Leon Kelly (1901–1982), American painter and draftsman, most well known for his contributions to American Surrealism.
 Ansel Adams (1902–1984), American photographer and environmentalist.
 Alan Watts (1915–1973), British philosopher, writer, and speaker.
 Pete Seeger (1919–2014), American folk singer.
 Audrey Hepburn (1929–1993), British actress and humanitarian.
 Carl Sagan (1934–1996), American astronomer, author, and science communicator.
 Jose Mujica (1935–), Uruguay president.
 Alan Vega (1938–2016), American vocalist, primarily known for his work with electronic protopunk duo Suicide.
 John A. Leslie (1940–), Canadian philosopher and writer.
 Reinhold Messner (1944–), Italian mountaineer, explorer, and author.
 Paul Harrison (1945–), English journalist, author of several books and reports on environment and development, and the founder and president of the World Pantheist Movement.
 Michio Kaku (1947–), American theoretical physicist and science communicator.
 Chris Goodall (1955–), English businessman and author.
 Mark Rylance (1960–), English actor.
 Jadav Payeng (1963–), Indian environmentalist and forestry worker.
 James Hetfield (1963–), American lead vocalist, rhythm guitarist, co-founder and main songwriter of heavy metal band Metallica.
 That Vegan Teacher (1964–), Canadian animal rights activist.
 Elon Musk (1971–), entrepreneur and business magnate.
 Gaahl (1975–), Norwegian black metal vocalist and a painter.

Groups

Africa
 Chukwu

Asia
 Advaita
 Taoism
 Vishistadvaita

Australia

Europe
 Peterburgian Vedism

Middle East
 Bektashi
 Sufis

North America
 Religious Science

South America

Pantheism

See also
Pandeism#Notable thinkers
Pierre Teilhard de Chardin
George Berkeley 
subjective idealism/'immaterialism'

References

External links
 Pantheist Index
 Pantheist Panorama

Pantheists